Tapp may refer to:

 Tapp (card game), a traditional south German card game
 Tapp Tarock, a traditional tarock card game played in Austria
 Tapp (surname)